Martin Staghøj Huldahl (born 20 September 2004) is a Danish footballer, who plays as a forward for Danish Superliga club Viborg FF.

Club career

Viborg FF
In his youth, Huldahl played for FC Midtjylland, before moving to Holstebro Boldklub in his hometown and later at the age of 15 to Viborg FF. Starting his career as a full-back, Huldahl was later retrained as a striker. In January 2022, Huldahl - who at the time was the topscorer of the Danish U-19 league - signed a contract with Viborg until June 2024. Per March 2022, as a retrained striker, Huldahl had already scored more than 50 goals as an U17 and U19 player in just a season and a half.

On 1 April 2022, 17-year old Huldahl got his official debut for Viborg FF, as he came on from the bench with 10 minutes left against SønderjyskE in the Danish Superliga.

References

External links
 

2004 births
Living people
Danish men's footballers
Association football forwards
FC Midtjylland players
Viborg FF players
Danish Superliga players
People from Holstebro